Oleg Anatolyevich Chirkunov (born 15 November 1958) is a Russian politician who served as the governor of Perm Krai from 12 March 2004 to 28 April 2012.

Early life 
He graduated from Perm State Technical University in 1981 and received a degree from the Higher School of the KGB of the USSR in Moscow in 1985, after which he entered service in the KGB. He subsequently graduated from the Law Department of Perm State University in 1988. He received his PhD in economics in 1990.

Career 
Chirkunov was the trade representative of Russia to Switzerland from 1991 to 1994. After that he worked with the business group «Eks». He was also a deputy of legislative assembly of Perm Oblast from 1997 to 2000. After this he became the representative of the region at Federation Council of Russia.
He was appointed acting governor of Perm Oblast in 2004, and was confirmed as governor of Perm Krai in 2005 (after the merger of Perm Oblast and Komi-Permyak Autonomous Okrug).

Chirkunov played a role in Vladimir Putin's rise to power, something he came to regret.

Perm 

Despite this history, Chirkunov left a mark as a reform-minded governor of Perm. He commissioned Marat Gelman, a prominent political scientist and art curator, to oversee "Project Perm" and revitalize the city to become a European center of culture. Gelman aspired to create an "artistic perestroika."

Perm, a city of brutal Soviet architecture and home to just under a million people, became an anomalous and relatively free political space under Chirkunov. While the Kremlin crushed opposition parties and independent media, "in Perm artists were encouraged to experiment, journalists could criticize, and visitors might think they were in Western Europe, rather than middle Russia."  Project Perm included a Museum of Contemporary Art; the White Nights Festival, a summer event which drew up to a million visitors; and the Perm-36 gulag museum, the only museum of the Soviet gulag experience and its terror, run by its former prisoners.

Resignation 

After Putin's re-election in 2012 amid widespread protests, the Russian state cracked down heavily on political dissent as well as the sponsorship of independent artistic expression such as that in Perm.
Chirkunov resigned as Perm governor in April 2012, after suffering constant verbal attacks on state television.

References

External links 
 Oleg Chirkunov's blog

1958 births
Living people
People from Kirovsk, Murmansk Oblast
Governors of Perm Krai
Members of the Federation Council of Russia (after 2000)
Russian bloggers
Academic staff of the Higher School of Economics